Karlstad University Press (KUP) is a university press affiliated with Karlstad University in Sweden. It was founded in 2003.

External links
 KUP website

Book publishing companies of Sweden
University presses of Sweden

Publishing companies established in 2003
Mass media in Karlstad
Karlstad University
2003 establishments in Sweden